Matías Pérez Acuña (born 9 February 1994) is an Argentine footballer who plays as a right full back.

Career
Pérez Acuña played as a centre back in Vélez Sarsfield's youth divisions and debuted professionally in a 3–2 away victory against Rosario Central for the 2013 Inicial, replacing Fabián Cubero as right full back. He was the 32nd youth player who debuted in Vélez under Ricardo Gareca's coaching. The defender was an unused substitute in Vélez' victory over Arsenal de Sarandí for the 2013 Supercopa Argentina.

In an interview in 2014, the retired Argentine international right full back Javier Zanetti stated that Pérez Acuña was the best young player in his position of the Argentine league.

Honours
Vélez Sarsfield
Supercopa Argentina (1): 2013

References

External links
Matías Pérez Acuña at Vélez Sarsfield 

Living people
1994 births
Footballers from Buenos Aires
Argentine footballers
Argentine Primera División players
Primera Nacional players
Club Atlético Vélez Sarsfield footballers
Quilmes Atlético Club footballers
Club Atlético Tigre footballers
Association football defenders